This is a list of Wikipedia science and technology articles by continent.

Africa
 History of science and technology in Africa

North Africa
 Science and technology in Algeria
 Science and technology in Morocco

West Africa
 Science and technology in Cabo Verde

Central Africa

East Africa
 Science and technology in Malawi
 Science and technology in Tanzania
 Science and technology in Uganda
 Science and technology in Zimbabwe

Southern Africa
 Science and technology in Botswana
 Science and technology in South Africa

Asia

Central Asia

Eastern Asia
 History of science and technology in China
 Science and technology of the Han Dynasty
 Science and technology of the Song Dynasty
 Song Dynasty technology, science, and engineering
 Science and technology of the Tang Dynasty
 Science and technology in China
 History of science and technology in Japan
 Science and technology in Japan
 History of science and technology in Korea

Southern Asia
 History of science and technology in the Indian subcontinent
 Science and technology in the Republic of India
 Science and technology in India
 Science and technology in Pakistan

Southeastern Asia 
 Science and technology in Indonesia
 Science and technology in Malaysia
 Thailand National Science and Technology Development Agency
 Science and technology in the Philippines

Western Asia
 Science and technology in Armenia
 Science and technology in Israel
 Science and technology in Iran
 Iran Science and technology
 Science and technology in Turkey
 Timeline of science and engineering in the Islamic world
 Science in the medieval Islamic world
 Inventions of the Islamic Golden Age
 Arab Agricultural Revolution
 Science and Technology in the Ottoman Empire

Europe
 Science and technology in Europe

Eastern Europe
 Science and technology in Bulgaria
 Timeline of Polish science and technology
 Science and technology in Romania
 Science and technology in Russia
 Timeline of Russian inventions and technology records
 Science and technology in the Soviet Union
 Science and technology in Ukraine

Northern Europe
 Science and technology in the United Kingdom

Southern Europe
 Science and technology in Albania
 Science and technology in Italy
 Science and technology in Portugal

Western Europe
 Science and technology in Belgium
 Science and technology in Brussels
 Science and technology in Flanders
 Science and technology in France
 Science and technology in Germany
 Science and technology in Switzerland

North America
 Science and technology in Canada
 Bibliography of science and technology in Canada
 Science and technology in Jamaica
 History of science and technology in Mexico
 Science and technology in the United States

Oceania

South America
 Science and technology in Argentina
 Brazilian science and technology
 Science and technology in Colombia
 Science and technology in Venezuela

See also

 History of science and technology
 List of years in science
 Science, technology and society

External links
 "Featured articles about science and technology." The Economic Times

Science and technology by continent
Science and technology articles